Vågsfjorden may refer to: